Power City may refer to:

 PowerCity (an electrical retail business in Ireland)
 Global City (the concept of a city that serves as a primary node in the global economic network)